The Party of Kanak Liberation (Palika) is a socialist pro-independence political party in New Caledonia. It is a component of the National Union for Independence, which in turn is one of the two components of the Kanak Socialist National Liberation Front (FLNKS).

History 
Palika started on the radical left, with Marxist rhetoric, in the 1970s. It participated, like the Caledonian Union (UC), in the Nationalist Front and later the FLNKS as the smaller, but more radical element. After the Matignon Accords, the division between Palika and UC heightened, and in 1995 Paul Néaoutyine led a dissident list (National Union for Independence, UNI) from the FLNKS' united list in the North Province. In 1999, the Palika and UC ran separate lists in all provinces. At the same time, the Palika became more moderate, favouring talks with loyalists but still having as a final goal full independence (as opposed to Free association supported by UC).

References 

Political parties in New Caledonia
Secessionist organizations
Melanesian socialism
Far-left politics
Socialist parties in New Caledonia